Copa Studio is a Brazilian animation studio based in Rio de Janeiro, founded in 2009. Its productions include Trunk Train (originally for TV Cultura and TV Brasil), Haunted Tales for Wicked Kids and Jorel's Brother for Cartoon Network, and Gigablaster and Blue Building Detectives - The Animated Series for Gloob, as well as some movies and television specials.

Series 
Kiara e os Luminitos (2009)
Trunk Train (Tromba Trem) (2010–2017)
Haunted Tales for Wicked Kids (Historietas Assombradas (para Crianças Malcriadas)) (2013–2016)
Jorel's Brother (O Irmão do Jorel) (2014–22)
Biduzidos (2018)
Mini Mini (As Microaventuras de Tito e Muda) (2018–present)
Ico Bit Zip (2019–present)
Giga Blaster (2019–present)
My Friend Twiga (Tuiga) (2019–present)
Blue Building Detectives - The Animated Series (D.P.A Detetives do Prédio Azul - Desenho Animado) (2022-present)

Others 
Um Conto de Páscoa (2011) - TV special based in Monica and Friends.
Haunted Tales - The Movie (Historietas Assombradas - O Filme) (2017)
My Little Pony: The Movie (2017) - Animation services
Johnny Test (2021–present) - Animation services
Trunk Train: The Movie (Tromba Trem - O Filme) (2022)

References

External links 
 

Brazilian animation studios
Mass media companies established in 2009